Pierre Stolze (born April 12, 1952 in Metz) He studied at École Normale Supérieure gaining a doctorate there with a thesis on science fiction. As a writer he began in 1979 and won the Prix Rosny-Aîné in 1991.

Bibliography
 1979 : Le serpent d'éternité, collection Galaxie/bis, ed. Opta, n°63.
 1980 : Kamtchatka , collection Galaxie/bis, éd. Opta, n°67.
 1986 : Marilyn Monroe et les Samouraïs du père Noël, ed. J'ai Lu - SF, n°1962.
 1990 : Cent mille images, ed. Philippe Olivier.
re-write for 1999 in collection Présence du Futur, n°603.
 1990 : Intrusions (stories), ed. Aurore (editor) SF, n°11.
 1994 : Le Déménagement (récit), Microéditions Maelström..
 1995 : Theophano 960.
 1995 : Volontaire désigné (stories).
 1996 : La Maison Usher ne chutera pas , Microéditions Destination Crépuscule.
re-write for 1999 in collection Présence du Futur, n°603.
 1996 : Greta Garbo et les crocodiles du Père Fouettard, ed. Hors Commerce, n°11.
 1998 : Volontaire désigné (novel), éd. Hors Commerce, n°16.
 2002 : Marlène Dietrich et les bretelles du Père Éternel (novel), ed. Hors Commerce, n°31.

External links

1952 births
French science fiction writers
École Normale Supérieure alumni
Living people
French male novelists